North Side is a Montreal-based software company. It was founded in 2000 and has been developing natural language understanding and natural language generation (together, dialogue) software since 2001.

History 
The company was founded by Eugene Joseph in 2000, after his first company, Virtual Prototypes Inc., went public on the Toronto Stock Exchange in July 1999; that company currently operates as Presagis, a wholly owned subsidiary of CAE. In the early 2000, North Side did R&D work funded in part by the Canadian Department of National Defence and National Research Council and Telefilm Canada. In 2007, North Side embarked on the development of Bot Colony, the first video game making coherent English dialogue with the characters an integral part of gameplay. The game development was financed in part by the Canada Media Fund. The first two episodes of Bot Colony were launched on Steam on June 17, 2014. Work on Bot Colony started in 2007 (preliminary work on parsing, ontologies, reasoning started much earlier in 2001). At the peak in 2014, the team had 45 members. The company spent a cumulative $23 million on the project, of which $20 million went towards R&D in natural language understanding.

Current activities 
The company launched VerbalAccess at Finovate in New York City on September 16, 2015. VerbalAccess provides an English interface to financial services, enabling both transactions and interactive FAQ in English. The ability to do banking transactions completely hands-off enables a person to bank through speech while driving, walking, etc. The technology also supports transactions via text-messages. The knowledge base of VerbalAccess spans financial services encompassing banking, credit cards, creditworthiness and loans, savings, and to a more limited extent, insurance and investments.

Technology 
For Bot Colony, North Side improved the natural language understanding pipeline by adding a semantic reasoner able to reason on logical axioms expressed in English (the equivalent of Prolog with predicates in English) and on formalized procedural knowledge expressed in English. A key feature distinguishing North Side's technology from an intelligent personal assistant based on machine learning, such as Apple's Siri, Google's Now, Microsoft's Cortana, Nuance's Nina or IBM's Watson, is its ability to clarify ambiguous or incomplete input and handle paraphrases, using a deterministic, rule-based approach. North Side relies on advances in parsing and disambiguation to understand language more precisely, making financial transactions through voice or text-messaging feasible. The underlying database technology supporting North Side's NLU technology is the Versant Object Database from Actian.

References

External links
Official website 

Organizations based in Montreal
Organizations established in 2000
Natural language generation